William Pereira (born 11 October 1996) is an English cricketer. He made his first-class debut on 1 April 2018 for Loughborough MCCU against Sussex as part of the Marylebone Cricket Club University fixtures.

References

External links
 

1996 births
Living people
English cricketers
Loughborough MCCU cricketers